Norbert Friedrich Isidor "Bert Schwarz" (18 December 1917 – 6 October 1999) was a Belgium-born Dutch politician of the Democrats 66 (D66) party. He was a Member of the Senate from 11 May 1971 until 20 September 1977.

References 
  Ir. N.F.I. (Bert) Schwarz Parlement & Politiek

1917 births
1999 deaths
Members of the Senate (Netherlands)
Members of the Provincial Council of South Holland
Democrats 66 politicians
Dutch civil engineers
Dutch humanists
Dutch Jews
Belgian emigrants to the Netherlands
Belgian Jews
Jewish Dutch politicians
Jewish humanists
Academic staff of the Delft University of Technology
Politicians from Antwerp